Otto Linher (15 December 1922 – 2 May 1953) was an Austrian alpine skier. He competed in the men's downhill at the 1952 Winter Olympics.

References

1922 births
1953 deaths
Austrian male alpine skiers
Olympic alpine skiers of Austria
Alpine skiers at the 1952 Winter Olympics
Sportspeople from Vorarlberg
People from Bludenz District
20th-century Austrian people